Sri is a 1999 Indonesian film directed by Marselli Sumarno. It was Indonesia's submission to the 72nd Academy Awards for the Academy Award for Best Foreign Language Film, but was not accepted as a nominee.

Plot 
Sri is a village girl married to Hendro, a 70-year old Javanese aristocrat. When Hendro falls ill, she has to nurse him back to health and negotiates with the God of Death not to take him away.

Cast 

 Rini Ariyanti as Sri
 Sardono W. Kusumo as Yamadipati
 R.M.T. Ronosuripto as Hendro
 Niniek L. Karim as Laksmi

See also

Cinema of Indonesia
List of Indonesian submissions for the Academy Award for Best Foreign Language Film

References

External links

1999 films
1999 drama films
Indonesian drama films